Heiner Möller (born 3 September 1948) is a West German former handball player who competed in the 1972 Summer Olympics.

He was born in Herford.

In 1972, he was part of the West German team which finished sixth in the Olympic tournament. He played three matches and scored eight goals.

External links

1948 births
Living people
German male handball players
Olympic handball players of West Germany
Handball players at the 1972 Summer Olympics
People from Herford
Sportspeople from Detmold (region)